Mary Elizabeth Kinnear (April 3, 1898 – December 24, 1991) was a Canadian senator.

Born in Wainfleet, Ontario, she was president of the National Federation of Liberal Women from 1959 to 1963. She was appointed to the Senate by Prime Minister Lester Pearson in 1967 representing the senatorial division of Welland, Ontario. A Liberal, she retired in 1973 on her 75th birthday.

References

External links
 

1898 births
1991 deaths
Liberal Party of Canada senators
Canadian senators from Ontario
People from the Regional Municipality of Niagara
Canadian feminists
Women members of the Senate of Canada
Women in Ontario politics
20th-century Canadian women politicians